Bicyclus uzungwensis is a butterfly in the family Nymphalidae. It is found in Tanzania. The habitat consists of montane forests.

Subspecies
Bicyclus uzungwensis uzungwensis (Tanzania: central to Udzungwa Mountains)
Bicyclus uzungwensis granti Kielland, 1990 (Tanzania: central to Rubeho Mountains)

References

Elymniini
Butterflies described in 1990
Endemic fauna of Tanzania
Butterflies of Africa